Grand Slam is an American game show based on the British series of the same name. Unlike the British series, which was played as a regular quiz show, the American version was conducted as a super-tournament featuring contestants who had appeared on other game shows.

Grand Slam aired on GSN for eight episodes from August 4, 2007 to September 8, 2007. Dennis Miller and Amanda Byram hosted the program and provided commentary between rounds. The questions were asked by Pat Kiernan, who was never seen on camera. The series was produced at Sony Music Studios in New York City by Embassy Row Productions in association with Sony Pictures Television and GSN. The 74-game Jeopardy! champion Ken Jennings won the Grand Slam tournament, defeating Ogi Ogas in the final round.

Premise
The program featured 16 of the biggest winners in United States game show history in a single-elimination tournament. The contestants were seeded by the amount of money they won on their original show(s). The winner took home the $100,000 Grand Prize and a crystal trophy.

Gameplay
The contestants faced off against each other in a rapid-fire style series of questions. There were four rounds of questioning: General Knowledge, Numbers and Logic, Words and Letters, and "Mixed" (questions from all of the previous categories). Exclusively for the final match, a fifth "Contemporary Knowledge" round was added as round #3, between "Numbers and Logic" and "Words and Letters." In each round, the players were given one minute on their clocks, and the first contestant (determined by coin toss for the first round where the loser goes first, alternates for each subsequent round) was asked a question by the off-camera "Questioner," and his or her clock started counting down. The timing mechanics were similar to those of a chess clock, if a contestant answered correctly, his or her clock stopped, and his opponent's clock started running. If the active contestant answered incorrectly or passed, their clock continued to run and another question was asked.

When one contestant's clock expired, the round ended and whatever time the other player had remaining carried over. At the beginning of the final round, players' carried-over time was added to the one-minute base time. Once a player's clock ran out, the other player was declared the winner and moved on to the next round.

Each contestant was given three "switches" at the beginning of the game, and one more before the fourth round: by saying "switch," a player could stop their own clock and start their opponent's with the current question. Switches could be used consecutively (by saying "switch back") to switch the question back and forth between contestants.

List of players
The players were seeded in the following order:

Tournament bracket
The listed score is the number of seconds the winner had remaining at the end of the match.

Results
Games are listed in the order in which they aired.

First round

Quarterfinals

Semifinals

Finals
A fifth round, Contemporary Knowledge, similar to the first round of the British series, was used in the Finals only.

References

External links
 
 

Game Show Network original programming
2000s American game shows
2007 American television series debuts
2007 American television series endings
Television series by Embassy Row (production company)
Television series by Sony Pictures Television
American television series based on British television series